John Kennedy (born 18 August 1983) is a Scottish professional football coach and former player who is the assistant manager of Scottish Premiership club Celtic. Since retirement, Kennedy has served as a scout, first-team coach and assistant manager to Neil Lennon, Ronny Deila, Brendan Rodgers and Ange Postecoglou, respectively. 

He played as a centre-back for Celtic and Norwich City, and won one international cap for Scotland. He suffered a serious knee injury on his international debut in March 2004, and retired in 2009 having failed to fully recover.

Since retiring from playing, Kennedy has worked as a scout and a coach for Celtic. In February 2019, he was appointed assistant manager of the club, and he became caretaker manager in February 2021 after Neil Lennon left Celtic. After the appointment of Ange Postecoglou as manager, he went back to being assistant manager.

Early life
John Kennedy was born on 18 August 1983 in Airdrie, North Lanarkshire. He is the maternal grandson of Celtic and Manchester United forward Jimmy Delaney and nephew of Motherwell defender Pat Delaney.

Playing career

Celtic
Kennedy came through Celtic's youth system and signed his first professional contract on the same day as fellow defender Stephen McManus. He made his first-team debut aged 16 during the 1999–2000 season. Kennedy was the youngest Celtic player to be called up to the first-team squad and then the youngest debutant. He played in the U18 team in 2000–01, and lost the Scottish Youth Cup final to Aberdeen. In the 2003–04 season, he had a run in the Celtic starting eleven and came under scrutiny from scouts of A.C. Milan who contacted Celtic about making a move. It was during this season that Kennedy scored his only goal for Celtic, against Dundee in the SPL.

Kennedy received high praise for his performance in a 0–0 draw with Barcelona in a UEFA Cup last-16 clash at the Camp Nou in March 2004.  
Within weeks he was given his international debut, but was seriously injured by a dangerous tackle during that match. Kennedy required several operations by Richard Steadman before he could even attempt a comeback. Following his injury, the SFA compensated Celtic with respect to Kennedy's wages, as it had been suffered while he was playing in an international match. Before his injury, Kennedy made enough appearances to qualify for a title medal and played twice in the Scottish Cup win that season.

Kennedy finally resumed training in late 2006, and was an unused substitute for Celtic's Champions League match against A.C. Milan on 20 February 2007. He played his first competitive match since the injury on 22 April 2007, when Celtic clinched the SPL championship by winning 2–1 against Kilmarnock. Four days later, on 26 April, Kennedy signed a new three-year contract with the club.

Kennedy made further appearances for Celtic over the next several months, but during a Champions League match against Shakhtar Donetsk on 28 November 2007, he was stretchered off after he twisted his knee on landing from an aerial challenge. The initial diagnosis was that he sustained damage to his lateral meniscus and the posterior lateral complex of the same knee he had previously injured, ruling him out for three months. This match proved to be Kennedy's final appearance for Celtic.

Norwich City (loan)
On 14 July 2008, BBC Sport reported that Kennedy had joined Motherwell on a six-month loan deal, but this report was denied by Celtic later that day. Kennedy did, however, meet up with the Motherwell squad in Austria, on trial. Soon afterwards Kennedy joined Norwich City on loan until January 2009. He made his Norwich debut in a 2–0 defeat to Coventry City at the Ricoh Arena on 9 August 2008. Kennedy's performances for Norwich were impressive, and he scored in games with Derby County and Preston North End.

Retirement
Kennedy suffered ankle ligament damage during his time at Norwich, and he returned to Celtic after further damaging his troubled knee in December 2008. On 13 November 2009, it was announced that, at the age of just 26, Kennedy had retired from football on medical grounds.

He was awarded a Special Recognition award at Celtic FC end of season awards in 2010.

International
Kennedy played in both legs of the play-off defeat to Croatia U21s to qualify for the Under-21 Euros in 2003. He was the only remaining regular fit Scotland U21 centre-back going in to the second leg. His only goal at under-21 level came from a Michael Stewart set piece in a 2–1 against Israel U21s in 2002.

Following fine performances for Celtic, Kennedy was called up to the Scotland squad for a friendly against Romania on 31 March 2004, and was selected to start the match. After 14 minutes, Kennedy sustained a serious injury to his leg after a late challenge by Ionel Ganea, which eventually ruled him out of action for almost three years.

Testimonial matches

A testimonial fixture for Kennedy between Scotland and Celtic was discussed, while a match between Finn Harps and Celtic had been arranged for 28 November 2010, but was postponed. The game was then played on Sunday 6 March, with Celtic winning 4–1. A further testimonial match was arranged for Sunday 22 May 2011 at Celtic Park between Celtic and some of the Celtic team that reached the 2003 UEFA Cup Final, including then manager Martin O'Neill. This match was also postponed, and eventually replaced with a match between a team of Celtic Legends, managed by Martin O'Neill, and a team of Manchester United Legends. The match was played on 9 August 2011 with Celtic winning 5–2, and the proceeds were donated to Oxfam's East Africa charity appeal.

Coaching career
After retiring as a player, Kennedy became a first-team scout for Celtic in 2010, working in this capacity for the club until 2011, travelling around Europe to help find new players for the club.

Kennedy gained coaching qualifications and worked as a coach with the club's U19 squad in season 2011–12, and the Development Squad (reserve team) from 2012 to 2014. He led the Celtic youth team to a league an cup double in 2011–12 and 2012–13 and a third straight title in 2013–14. Kennedy also oversaw the Under-19 team compete in the NextGen Series in 2011–12, a pan-European competition for youth teams.

He became first-team coach in 2014 after the appointment of Ronny Deila as manager, winning the Scottish league championship in each of Deila's two seasons in charge, as well as the Scottish League Cup in 2014–15. He continued in the role under Brendan Rodgers from 2016, and Celtic won domestic trebles in both 2016–17 and 2017–18. In February 2019, Kennedy was promoted to assistant manager when Neil Lennon replaced Rodgers as manager.

After the resignation of Neil Lennon in February 2021, Kennedy was appointed caretaker manager of Celtic.

Charity work
In the summer of 2010, Kennedy joined the board of Directors of the UK based charity Football Aid. Kennedy is also a patron of Les Hoey's Dreammaker Foundation.

Managerial statistics

Honours

Player
Celtic
Scottish Premier League: 2003–04, 2007–08

Manager
Celtic
SPFL Development League: 2011–12, 2012–13, 2013–14
Scottish Youth Cup: 2011–12, 2012–13

References

External links

1983 births
Living people
Footballers from Airdrie, North Lanarkshire
Scottish footballers
Association football defenders
Celtic F.C. players
Norwich City F.C. players
Scottish Premier League players
English Football League players
Scottish football managers
Scottish Professional Football League managers
Scotland under-21 international footballers
Scotland B international footballers
Scotland international footballers
Association football coaches
Association football scouts
Celtic F.C. non-playing staff